Yim Tin Tze (or Yim Tin Tsai) is a small offshore island in Sai Kung District, Hong Kong.

As of 2013 there is at least one person living on the island again after a long absence of a permanent population.

Geography
The island has an area of 24 hectares (49 acres). It is located in Port Shelter, the harbour located south of Sai Kung Peninsula and east of the Sai Kung mainland. It is connected by a breakwater in its southern part to the larger island of Kau Sai Chau. People can freely cross over to Kau Sai Chau and follow the walking trails as of 2018.

The smaller islands of Shek Chau and Kwun Cham Wan are located off the coast of Yim Tin Tsai, in the northwest and the southwest respectively.

Administration
Yim Tin Tsai is a recognised village under the New Territories Small House Policy.

History
The island was settled by members of the Hakka Chan (陳) clan during the 19th century (other sources mention 300 years ago). The Chans came from Yim Tin (鹽田; pinyin: Yántián), now part of the Yantian District of Shenzhen. The new settlement was called Yim Tin Tsai in its memory. Other members of the clan settled in Yim Tin Tsai in Tai Po and Ping Yeung, in Ta Kwu Ling, North District. At its peak, Yim Tin Tsai had 500 inhabitants (other sources mention 1,200).

Villagers lived on farming, fishing and salt-making. They farmed  of salt field, the smallest of the five salt fields in Hong Kong at the time. Other salt fields were in Tai O, Lantau Island, San Hui and Wong Ka Wai in Tuen Mun, Yim Liu Ha in Sha Tau Kok and Yim Tin Tsai in Tai Po.

Baptism of the island's residents started in 1866, and by 1875, all villagers on the island were baptised. In 1879 a chapel was set up by Joseph Freinademetz (who was canonised in 2003).

Ching Po School, the village school closed down in the 1990s due to a lack of students.

A groundbreaking ceremony was held on 17 March 2013 after the village was given approval to revitalise its abandoned salt fields. Chief Secretary Carrie Lam and then Vicar-General of the Catholic Diocese of Hong Kong Dominic Chan officiated the ceremony. The event was recorded by the YouTube personality, a descendant of the Chan clan.

Features
The current St. Joseph's Chapel replaced the first chapel on Yim Tin Tsai. Built in Italian Romanesque style, it was completed in 1890, with a school adjacent to it. The chapel is a Grade III historic building. It has been renovated three times, the last being in 2004. Cardinal Zen held a special mass in the chapel on 7 May 2006.

The Yim Tin Tsai Typhoon Shelter, established in 1968, is located at the east of the island. It is bordered on the east by the northern part of Kau Sai Chau, and by breakwaters in the north and south.

Mangrove is found off the breakwater linking Yim Tin Tsai and Kau Sai Chau.

The Louisa Landale Campsite, managed by the Hong Kong Girl Guides Association, is located in the southern part of the island.

Chan Man-hei, another descendant of the Chan clan, runs the Facebook group for the village.

Conservation
The rehabilitation of the abandoned St. Joseph's Chapel received an Award of Distinction as part of the 2005 UNESCO Asia-Pacific Heritage Awards.

The revitalisation of the saltpans of Yim Tin Tsai received an Honourable Mention in the UNESCO Asia-Pacific Awards for Cultural Heritage Conservation in 2015.

Transport
Yim Tin Tsai can be reached by private ferry from Sai Kung Town.

See also

 Islands and peninsulas of Hong Kong

References

External links

 Delineation of area of existing village Yim Tin Tsai (Sai Kung) for election of resident representative (2019 to 2022)
 Map of Yim Tin Tsai
 How They Made Salt in Yim Tin Tsai (archive)
 Pictures of Yim Tin Tsai
 Picture of the former village school

Islands of Hong Kong
Sai Kung District
Former populated places in Hong Kong
Populated places in Hong Kong